Bigham is a surname. The Surname possibly comes from Bigholm Road in Bieth, Scotland. Notable people with the surname include:

Brett Bigham, American educator
Clive Bigham, 2nd Viscount Mersey (1872-1956), British peer and politician
Daniel Bigham (born 1991), British racing cyclist
David Bigham (born 1971), British athlete
John Bigham, 1st Viscount Mersey (1840-1929), British jurist and politician
Karla Bigham (born 1979), American politician
Trevor Bigham (1876-1954), British barrister

Surnames
Surnames of Scottish origin
Surnames of British Isles origin